Anyon fusion is the process by which multiple anyons behave as one larger composite anyon. Anyon fusion is essential to understanding the physics of non-abelian anyons and how they can be used in quantum information.

Abelian anyons
If  identical abelian anyons each with individual statistics  (that is, the system picks up a phase  when two individual anyons undergo adiabatic counterclockwise exchange) all fuse together, they together have statistics . This can be seen by noting that upon counterclockwise rotation of two composite anyons about each other, there are  pairs of individual anyons (one in the first composite anyon, one in the second composite anyon) that each contribute a phase . An analogous analysis applies to the fusion of non-identical abelian anyons. The statistics of the composite anyon is uniquely determined by the statistics of its components.

Non-abelian anyon fusion rules

Non-abelian anyons have more complicated fusion relations. As a rule, in a system with non-abelian anyons, there is a composite particle whose statistics label is not uniquely determined by the statistics labels of its components, but rather exists as a quantum superposition (this is completely analogous to how two fermions known to each have spin 1/2 and 3/2 are together in quantum superposition of total spin 1 and 2). If the overall statistics of the fusion of all of several anyons is known, there is still ambiguity in the fusion of some subsets of those anyons, and each possibility is a unique quantum state. These multiple states provide a Hilbert space on which quantum computation can be done.

Each anyon type  should also have a conjugate antiparticle  among the list of possible anyon types, such that , i.e. it can annihilate with its antiparticle. The anyon type label does not specify all of the information about the anyon, but the information that it does indicate is topologically invariant under local perturbations.

The  operation is commutative and associative, as it must be to physically make sense with fused anyons.

Fusion rules can also be generalized to consider in how many ways  a collection  can be fused to a final anyon type .

Hilbert spaces of fusion processes

This forms a Hilbert space. When , such as in the Ising and Fibonacci examples,  is at most just a one dimensional space with one state. The direct sum  is a decomposition of  the tensor product of the Hilbert space of individual anyon  and the Hilbert space of individual anyon .

More complicated Hilbert spaces can be constructed corresponding to the fusion of three or more particles, i.e. for the quantum systems where it is known that the   fuse into final anyon type . This Hilbert space  would describe, for example, the quantum system formed by starting with a quasiparticle  and, via some local physical procedure, splitting up that quasiparticle into quasiparticles  (because in such a system all the anyons must necessarily fuse back into  by topological invariance). As mentioned in the previous section, the permutations of the labels are also isomorphic. 

There are many arbitrary ways one can do this, each of which can be used to derive a different decomposition of  into pairs of pants. One possible choice is to first fuse  and  into , then fuse  and  into , and so on. This approach shows us that , and correspondingly  where  is the matrix defined in the previous section.

This decomposition manifestly indicates a choice of basis for the Hilbert space. Different arbitrary choices of the order in which to fuse anyons will correspond to different choices of basis.

References

Quantum mechanics